The Tip is an album by David Murray released on the Japanese DIW label. Recorded in 1994 and released in 1995, the album features performances by Murray with Robert Irving III, Bobby Broom, Darryl Jones, Toby Williams and Kahil El'Zabar.

Reception
The Allmusic review awarded the album 3 stars stating "Murray plays with as much focus and imagination as ever, and The Tip shows his depth and diversity as a musician as well as his willingness to explore new formats. The Tip is an accessible, energetic, and thoroughly enjoyable Murray outing".

Track listing
 "Sex Machine" (Sly Stone) - 14:12   
 "Flowers for Albert" (David Murray) - 9:20   
 "Removen Veil" (Darryl Jones) - 3:15   
 "M.D." (Robert Irving III) - 7:53   
 "Kahari Romare" (Kahil El'Zabar) - 9:13   
 "The Tip" (Jones) - 6:28   
 "Mailinda" (Irving) - 10:08   
 "One World Family" (El'Zabar, Murray) - 6:00

Personnel
David Murray - tenor saxophone, bass clarinet
Robert Irving III - synthesizer, organ
Bobby Broom - guitar
Daryl Thompson - guitar (tracks 1, 3 & 7)
Darryl Jones - bass
Toby Williams - drums
Kahil El'Zabar - percussion, vocal
Olu Dara - cornet (track 2)
G'Ra - vocals (track 3)

References

1995 albums
David Murray (saxophonist) albums
DIW Records albums